Johan Cronman (November 2, 1662 – July 26, 1737) was a lieutenant general and the commandant of the Skåne fortress in the Swedish Empire as well as the Governor of Malmöhus County from 1727 to 1737. He was Baron of Alatskivi, Kodafer and Kokora; and Master of Vosuauer and Sattkula.

Biography
He was born on November 2, 1662, in Unanitz, Ingria. He was the son of Joakim Cronman (1638–1703) and Lunetta Makeléer (1639–1693). Lunetta was the daughter of John Hans Makeléer who was a merchant and banker who had emigrated from Scotland to Sweden. Johan joined the military and was commissioned as a lieutenant with the Narva garrison, and second captain with the Närke and Värmland regiments in 1687. He was promoted to captain with the Zurlauben regiment in 1699, and was made a lieutenant-colonel in 1701. He was promoted to colonel of the Kronoberg Regiment in 1706. On July 11, 1709, he was at surrender at Perevolochna and held prisoner in Siberia until 1722. Johan returned to Sweden after his release and was promoted to lieutenant-general of the infantry in 1722. He was made a baron in 1727, and named the Governor of Malmö and commandant of Malmö Castle, both in 1727. Through his life, he fought in 13 battles, but was never wounded. He spoke 8 languages: Swedish, Latin, German, Estonian, Polish, Russian, French and Dutch. He died on July 26, 1737, at age 75. He had never married or had children.

Legacy
A plaque at St Petri, Malmö, reads in German: 

It translates into English as:
His Royal Majesty of Sweden recognizes
Lieutenant General of the Infantry, 
Governor and High Commandant at the Fortress of Skåne,
Honourable Baron Mr. Johan Cronman, Baron to Alatskivi, Kodafer and Kokora, Master of Wasuva (possibly) and
Sottkylä (possibly). Born at Alatskivi November 2, 1662. Died in Malmö on July
26, 1737.
A plaque at Caroli Church in Malmö reads:

It translates into English as:
Here lies
Lieutenant General, Baron,
Governor,
and Commandant
Johan Cronmann.
Baron of old
and new Alatskivi.
Lord of Kokora
and Sottkylä.
Year 1737

See also
Military ranks of the Swedish Armed Forces
St Petri, Malmö

References

Images

External links

Cronman family tree based on Gabriel Anrep and Gustaf Elgenstierna
Johan Cronman grave in Malmö

1662 births
1737 deaths
17th-century Swedish military personnel
Politicians from Malmö
Governors of Malmöhus County
Swedish people of German descent
Johan
People from Peipsiääre Parish
Swedish military personnel of the Great Northern War
Swedish prisoners of war
18th-century Swedish military personnel
Prisoners of war held by Russia
Swedish Army lieutenant generals
Age of Liberty people
People from Scania
People from Swedish Livonia